Blossoms on Broadway is a 1937 American comedy film directed by Richard Wallace and written by Theodore Reeves.

The film stars Edward Arnold, Shirley Ross, John Trent, Rufe Davis, Joe Weber, and Lew Fields. The film was released on November 19, 1937, by Paramount Pictures.

Plot

Cast 

 Edward Arnold as Ira Collins
 Shirley Ross as Sally Shea
 John Trent as Neil Graham
 Rufe Davis as Sheriff Jeff Holloway
 Joe Weber as Weber 
 Lew Fields as Fields 
 William Frawley as Frances X. Rush
 Frank Craven as P.J. Quinterfield, Sr.
 Kitty Kelly as 'Death Valley' Cora Keane
 Johnny Arthur as P.J. Quinterfield, Jr.
 Edward Brophy as Mr. Prussic
 Charles Halton as Dr. Gilgallon
 Eddie Bartell as Eddie
 Jimmy Hollywood as Jimmy
 Frederick Clarke as Chester

References

External links 

 

1937 films
Paramount Pictures films
American comedy films
1937 comedy films
Films directed by Richard Wallace
American black-and-white films
1930s English-language films
1930s American films